The Headless Woman (Spanish:La mujer sin cabeza) is a 1944 Mexican mystery film directed by René Cardona and starring David T. Bamberg and Manuel Medel.

Cast
   David T. Bamberg as Fu Manchu  
 Alfonso Bedoya 
 Roberto Cañedo 
 Cuquita Escobar 
 Paco Fuentes 
 Ramón G. Larrea 
 Manuel Medel as Satanás 
 Manuel Noriega 
 Francisco Pando 
 Ignacio Peón 
 Carlos Riquelme 
 Humberto Rodríguez 
 Fernando Romero 
 Ángel T. Sala 
 Milisa Sierra     
 Arturo Soto Rangel    
 Jorge Trevino  
 Jesús Valero

References

Bibliography 
 Cotter, Bob. The Mexican Masked Wrestler and Monster Filmography. McFarland & Company, 2005.

External links 
 

1944 films
1944 mystery films
Mexican mystery films
1940s Spanish-language films
Films directed by René Cardona

Mexican black-and-white films
1940s Mexican films